Lorraine is a cultural and historical region in northeastern France.

Lorraine may also refer to:

People and fictional characters
 Lorraine (given name)
 Lorraine (surname)
 Anna of Lorraine (1522–1568)
 Cardinal of Lorraine (disambiguation)
 Catherine of Lorraine (disambiguation)
 Charles of Lorraine (disambiguation)
 Christina of Lorraine (1565–1637)
 Claude of Lorraine (disambiguation)
 Frederick of Lorraine (disambiguation)

Places

Africa

South Africa
 Lorraine, Limpopo, a town in the Limpopo province
 Lorraine, Port Elizabeth, a suburb of Port Elizabeth

Europe
 Belgian Lorraine
 Duchy of Lorraine (Upper Lorraine), a duchy partitioned from Lotharingia in 959, which became the modern French region of Lorraine
 German Lorraine
 Lorraine railway viaduct, Bern, Switzerland
 Lorraine Regional Natural Park, a protected area of northeastern France
 Lotharingia, or Lorraine, a short-lived kingdom in western Europe, later an independent duchy

North America

Canada
 Lorraine, Alberta
 Lorraine, Quebec, a suburb of Montreal
 Lorraine Formation, a geologic formation in Quebec
 Lorraine, a community within the city of Port Colborne, Ontario

United States
 Lorraine, Florida
 Lorraine, Kansas, a city
 Lorraine, Tangipahoa Parish, Louisiana
 Lorraine, New York, a town
 Lorraine (CDP), New York, a hamlet and census-designated place in the town
 Lorraine, Virginia, an unincorporated community
 Lorraine Group, a geologic group in Tennessee

Elsewhere
 1114 Lorraine, an asteroid
 Lorraine Island, Australia
 Lower Lorraine, a duchy partitioned from Lotharingia

Arts and entertainment

Music

Groups
 Lorraine (band), a musical trio from Bergen, Norway

Albums
 Lorraine (album), a 2011 album from American folk music singer Lori McKenna

Songs
 "Lorraine" (Kaffe song), Bulgaria's entry for Eurovision 2005
 "Lorraine" (My Beautiful Alsace Lorraine), a 1917 song written by Al Bryan and Fred Fisher
 "Lorraine", by The Allisons, 1961
 "Lorraine", by Bad Manners from Klass, 1983
 "Lorraine", by Freakwater, 1999
 "Lorraine", by Joey Dee and the Starliters, 1958
 "Lorraine", by Stage Dolls from Stage Dolls, 1988
 "Lorraine", by Toto from Hydra, 1979

Television
 Lorraine (TV programme), a British breakfast television programme on ITV

Computing and technology
 Lorraine, the workname used by Jay Miner for the first prototype of the Amiga computer
 Lorraine, codename for the Amiga Motorola 68000 chipset

Military
 Battle of Lorraine, a World War I battle between France and Germany
 French battleship Lorraine, a 1913 World War II battleship
 Operation Lorraine, a French Union military operation during the First Indochina War
 SMS Lothringen, a 1904 German pre-dreadnought of World War I, also known as Lorraine

Vehicles
 Lorraine (automobile), an American car manufacturer
 La Lorraine, a French automobile manufactured from 1899 to 1902
 Lorraine-Dietrich, a French automobile and aircraft engine manufacturer between 1920 and 1935; known as Lorraine from 1928 on

Other uses
 Lorraine (cocktail)
 Lorraine Motel, site of the Martin Luther King, Jr. assassination

See also
 
 Cercle de Lorraine, a business club in Brussels, Belgium
 Circuit de Lorraine, a bicycle racing event
 Dame Lorraine, a carnival character
 Joan of Lorraine, a 1946 play by Maxwell Anderson
 Little Lorraine, Cape Breton, Nova Scotia, Canada
 Quiche Lorraine (disambiguation)
 Lorene, a given name
 Hurricane Lorraine (disambiguation), three tropical cyclones in the eastern Pacific Ocean
 Lorain (disambiguation)
 Loraine (disambiguation)
 Lorane (disambiguation)
 Lorrain (disambiguation)